Haliplus variegatus is a Palearctic species of water beetle in the Haliplidae family.

References

External links
Habitas

Beetles described in 1834
Vulnerable animals
Haliplidae